Salak Tinggi ERL station  is a station on the Express Rail Link (ERL) in Salak Tinggi, Sepang District, Selangor, Malaysia. It is served by KLIA Transit. The multi-storey park-and-ride facilities at the station can cater daily commuters Bandar Salak Tinggi and its neighbourhood to airport & city centre which integrate the public transport system with private car use.

Feeder buses

Around the station
Kota Warisan township
Xiamen University Malaysia
Sunsuria City
Le Park Sunsuria City

References

Express Rail Link
Rapid transit stations in Selangor